The Japanese invasion of Taiwan could refer to:

 Japanese invasion of Taiwan (1616), resulting in Japanese retreat
 Japanese invasion of Taiwan (1874), resulting in Chinese reparations
 Japanese invasion of Taiwan (1895), resulting in Japanese annexation